Miriam Cabessa (born 1966) is an Israeli-American painter, performance and installation artist. Cabessa was born in Morocco, raised in Israel, and has lived and worked in New York City since 2000. Her slow action painting has been internationally recognized since 1997 when she represented Israel at the Venice Biennale. Over the past two decades, she has abstained from using brushes, opting to make marks with objects and her body. Her imagery ranges from organic to mechanistic with surfaces that are both haptically handmade and digitally serene. Cabessa has shown extensively in the U.S., Europe, and Israel.

Biography

Miriam Cabessa was born in 1966 in Casablanca, Morocco. In 1969 she immigrated to Israel together with her family and settled in the city of Tiberias. At the age of thirteen, she moved to Kibbutz Sha'ar Hagolan in the Jordan Valley. She grew up in an artistic home: her father was a jazz trumpeter and her mother ran the “Maskit” shop of Tiberias (a state-owned company promoting locally produced fashion and crafts) and founded a sewing school named after her, the “Helen” School. Cabessa started following private drawing lessons at the age of six and later studied painting at Tel Hai College. She also trained horses at the farm of Kibbutz Sha'ar Hagolan. At seventeen she qualified for a brown belt in karate and worked as a karate coach at Kibbutz Afikim. She was also one of the first windsurfers to windsurf on the Sea of Galilee. She served in the Israeli army in the mid-1980s and moved to Tel Aviv after completing her military service.
 
In the year 1988, Cabessa studied at the late Kalisher painting school, after which she studied privately with the artist Tamara Rickman for three years. Cabessa went on to study Fine Art at the Midrasha Art School from 1991 to 1993, and Theory and Criticism at Camera Obscura in 1997. Soon after completing her degree at the Midrasha, she was invited to participate in a group exhibition at the Tel Aviv Art Museum curated by Ellen Ginton. She gained public attention in 1993 with her first solo exhibition at Dvir Gallery, where she presented a series of paintings on masonite that laid the foundations for her artistic identity: using houseware items such as mops, garbage cans, plates and drinking glasses, Cabessa devised a unique and innovative technique to create painterly representations of three-dimensional pipes. Although seemingly complex and computer-generated, the works were all handmade by the artist. The gap between these images and their production process aroused much skepticism and wonder. The exhibition's works thrived on the Israeli art market and positioned Cabessa as a promising young artist. In 1995 she became the first winner of the Gottesdiener Prize, sponsored by the Tel Aviv Art Museum and considered as one of the most prestigious prizes for Israeli artists. At the Gottesdiener Prize exhibition she presented paintings on masonite and graphite works on paper. The show was accompanied by a catalog.

In 1997 Cabessa was chosen by Sarah Breitberg-Semel to represent Israel at the Israeli pavilion of the Venice Biennale, together with Israeli artists Sigalit Landau and Yossi Berger. Cabessa exhibited a series of paintings which notably refined and consolidated the artist's pictural language: the presented black-and-white oil paintings on masonite of abstract swirls and stripes confirmed the artist's high degree of artistic precision, virtuosity and control. Whereas her show at Dvir Gallery had demonstrated her immense capacity for imagination, the Biennale exhibition established her abilities for restraint and self-discipline. One of the works in the series is a “30-second painting”, titled after the duration for which Cabessa imprinted her touch on the painting. Plastik Magazine published a reproduction of this work along with an interview of the artist by Reilly Azoulay. The use of performative constraints and self-instructions allows Cabessa to reformulate the painterly act as both process-based and conceptually driven. The “30-second” constraint is borrowed from the military realm; yet the additional instruction to touch the painting's surface with eyes closed serves to turn a masculine principle into a feminine, intimate and sensual act. This will later lead Cabessa to create public painting performances, exposing to the audience the intimacy of her painting process.

In 1998, Cabessa presented “Mummies”, a series of powerful works produced with a cold and hot iron. This series mimics the act of ironing in a seemingly desperate attempt to flatten out the surface of the painting, bringing to mind both modernism and the tradition of flat painting. Cabessa's choice of painting tools is part of a conscious attempt to turn domestic appliances into feminist instruments: she disconnects houseware items from their original function and redefines their purpose within a new and elevated context. Cabessa has thus transformed garbage cans, rags and squeegees into painting tools. In doing so, she is to be associated with feminist artists from the 1980s such as Barbara Krueger, Cindy Sherman and Sherry Levine, who rather than striving to master the act of painting itself have aimed to question how women could enter the male-dominated world of painting. Hence the act of ironing touches upon both personal memories - the smell of ironing in Cabessa's childhood home - and a much wider feminist aspiration: to break through social and gender limitations.

Before her departure to New York, Cabessa exhibited at Dvir Gallery a painting series of imaginary urban landscapes of New York City. She moved to Manhattan in October 1999 and joined the ISCP studio residency program a year later. In 2001 she started working with Stefan Stux Gallery, leading her work to gain a wider exposure on the New York art scene. In 2002, she participated in a group exhibition curated by John Yao at the Maryland Institute College of Art. This led Yao and Cabessa to initiate a close dialogue on Cabessa's work; its mode of action, its pictorial language and its bodily presence. Yao uncovered the femininity in Cabessa's work and the ingenuity with which it evades masculine motion; some aspects of the artist's practice which only grew stronger and sharper over the years. Cabessa began to think of her work in terms of language: she wanted to formulate a unique language of painting movements by tapping into a much wider context. At this stage, personal and spiritual investigations had become more prevalent in her life and work. She became associated with various spiritual groups operating in New York and beyond ("Circle Paintings", a solo exhibition at Alon Segev Gallery in Tel Aviv, 2003). Her work became particularly influenced by Sufi whirling: the loss of orientation and sense of ecstasy that this practice generates allows for a change in consciousness which guided the artist in her painting. Cabessa would walk around the canvas for long hours, retracing a neverending circular motion.

In 2004, Cabessa's painting process was filmed for the first time in a series of five video works, each lasting a few minutes, documenting her painting action from start to finish.

Between 2005 and 2009, Cabessa participated in group exhibitions in the United States and in Europe. In 2008, she exhibited at Slate Gallery a series of 30 paintings entitled "79" and entirely made with oil and gold dust. 79 is the atomic number of the chemical element of gold which pigment Cabessa used in her paintings.

In 2009 she performed for the first time in front of an audience. In a performance called "Slow motion action painting," she painted on a 15-meter-long canvas using a keffiyeh and a tallit (Jewish prayer shawl). The performance was supported by Artis and presented at Pulse Art Fair on its opening day for 12 consecutive hours. In choosing a keffiyeh and a tallit as painting tools, Cabessa neutralized the highly symbolic charge of those traditional garments while simultaneously uniting them into a harmonious form through the act of painting. They give in to each other and follow each other's motion, in a dialogue that is both formal and conceptual.

In 2010, following a deepened spiritual process, Cabessa exhibited a series of works described as “slow-motion action painting” in which she examined the movement generated by meditative and conscious breathing. The resulting paintings present themselves as breathing traces, or seismographs of the body's vibrations. These works have been shown on a number of platforms throughout the world.

In 2012, after eight years during which she was unable to leave the United States (from 2003 to 2012), Cabassa held a performance at Rothschild 69 Gallery in Tel Aviv, for which she invited about 100 guests. “Performance” had two stages: in the first stage, Cabessa reenacted painting actions from her past works, engaging in a kind of live retrospective. In the second stage, she crawled from one side of the five meter-long surface to the other. The crawling action, a unit of time in itself, served to redefine and delineate time. 
In the same year Cabessa exhibited a series of Circle paintings at the Nye+Brown Gallery in Los Angeles, which specializes in artists from the 1960s. Their interest in Cabessa's work lied in the Pop-Art quality proper to this series of painting.

In 2014, Cabessa presented a solo exhibition at Julie M. Gallery in Tel Aviv. She painted on 50 cm wide stickers that ran along all the gallery walls (42 meters), totaling 100 meters of painting. This work was produced in her studio over the length of several months as a stream of consciousness or intuitive writing. The final painting was thus presented just as it was made, without any painting rehearsal or subsequent correction.
 
In 2015, Cabessa exhibited at Jenn Singer Gallery in New York. For this painting series, Cabessa laid out books she had read and especially liked onto an oil-covered plywood surface, leaving the imprint of their open pages on the surface and at times even inverted letters from the text. She presented close to fifty paintings bearing the imprints of books by authors such as Nabokov and Kafka, selected from Cabessa's collection of most influential books. The produced images deliberately resemble a series of vaginas: like spread-out legs, the imprints of the open books symbolically serve to feminize the books’ mostly male writers. The surprising aspect of this process consisted in the wide variety of images produced from similar-looking books.

At the beginning of 2017, Cabessa decided to start running a studio in Tel Aviv in parallel to her studio in New York, and it is with a strong sense of nostalgia that she returned to the country and landscapes of her birth. She was invited to work at the Harel printing workshop which had just inaugurated a printing press for formats of 2 meters by 1.40 meters, and on which Cabessa was commissioned to produce a new series of works. She chose to use the printing press as one of her painting tools: the Kinneret print series was produced using the press to spread out color. The press served to produce the paint stain, using a mixture of oil paints and metallic pigments to create images reminiscent of the light reflections and surface changes on the Sea of Galilee. The return to the Sea of Galilee is for Cabessa a return to her childhood years when she used to live in Tiberias and observe for long hours the water's changing surface and reflection. As a windsurfer in her youth, Cabessa had established a deep connection with the lake. About 20 works from this series of monotypes were selected for an exhibition at Harel Gallery.

In 2018, she presented her first collaborative project “Night Painting” at the Uri and Rami Nehoshtan Museum, a contemporary art museum located in Kibbutz Ashdot Yaakov in the Jordan Valley, curated by its director Smadar Keren. The work was created in collaboration with theater director Noam Ben Azar and his group of actors. Over the course of a year, they met for a series of improvisation exercises based on the “Grid technique”. This technique acts as a framework for producing incidental interactions and compositions, and allows the actors to reach a deeper intuitive state from which to draw material for their performance. During the sessions, actors were directed by Ben Azar to move around the space following imaginary vertical and horizontal lines on the canvas, tuning themselves to their own body and feelings while maintaining an acute awareness of others’ movements in the space; during that time Cabessa worked with diluted oil paint on the canvas, alternately adding and subtracting paint. This resulted in a four-hour live performance, video and large-scale painting.

In early 2019, Cabessa created “Living Room”, a temporary painting installation that takes over the living room of an old Brooklyn apartment. The 100-year-old building is set to be renovated in the course of 2019. The piece took eight full days to complete. Cabessa painted over the entire space, including the walls, floor and furniture - lamp, table, chair, couch, etc., using the vibration of her own breath to dictate the rhythm of her brushstrokes. If the painting gesture is usually associated with fast and intuitive movements, in this piece it becomes the result of a very slow and careful observation of the breath. This piece marks the beginning of a new direction in Cabessa's work.

Selected solo exhibitions

 2020 – Time of the World, Be׳eri Gallery, Kibbutz Be’eri, Israel
 2019 – Living Room, Painting installation, Brooklyn, NY 
 2019 – EPOS International Art Film Festival, screening of “Night Shift at the Museum”, Tel Aviv Art Museum, Israel
 2018 – “Night Painting”, Painting and Video, Beit Uri and Rami Nehostan Museum, Ashdot Ya’acov, Israel
 2017 – "Illustrated Transitions" Monotypes, Har-el Gallery, Jaffa, Israel
 2015 – Hands On, Dryansky Gallery, San Francisco CA
 2015 – an•thro•pom•e•try, Jenn Singer Gallery, New York NY
 2014 – Painting Installation, Julie M. Gallery, Tel Aviv, Israel
 2012 – "Variations with Hands", Performance, Tel Aviv Museum, Tel Aviv, Israel
 2012 – Miriam Cabessa / / Performance, Rothschild 69, Tel Aviv, Israel
 2011 – "In Her Wake", Julie M. Gallery , Toronto, Canada
 2010 – 79, Slate Gallery, Brooklyn, New York
 2009 – Slow Motion Action Painting, Performance, Pulse Art Fair, New York
 2008 – Marking Time, Lyons Wier Ortt Gallery, New York
 2007 – Shelef & Schneidman, Tel Aviv, Israel
 2005 – Moti Hasson Gallery, New York         
 2004 – Pack Gallery, Milan, Italy
 2003 – Alon Segev Gallery, Tel Aviv, Israel
 2001 – New Paintings, Stefan Stux Gallery, Project Room, New York
 1999 – Dvir Gallery, Tel Aviv, Israel
 1999 – Letters, " The Office " Gallery, Tel Aviv, Israel
 1998 – Coins, Oranim College of Art, Israel
 1998 – Installation, Kibbutz Rosh-Ha'nekra, Israel        
 1998 – Dvir Gallery, Tel Aviv, Israel
 1997 – Venice Biennale, Israeli Pavilion, Venice, Italy               
 1996 – The Nathan Gottesdiener Foundation Israeli Art Prize, Tel Aviv Museum of Art, Israel
 1996 – Mary Faouzi Gallery, Jaffa, Israel
 1995 – Palindrome, Installation at Janco-Dada House, En-Hod, Israel      
 1995 – New Work, Tel – Hai Gallery, Tel Hai, Israel         
 1994 – Pyramus and Thisbe, Installation Kibbutz-Nachshon Gallery, Israel               
 1994 – Dvir Gallery, Tel Aviv, Israel

Selected group exhibitions

 2020 – Groundwater, Contemporary Art Gallery of the city of Ramat HaSharon, Israel
 2020 – Calling the Goddess, Beit HaIr, Tel Aviv 
 2020 – The Mechanical Body, Bar-David Museum, Kibbutz Baram, Israel
 2019 – Hotel Utopia, Brown Hotel, Tel Aviv
 2019 – Zumu nomadic museum, Hatsor HaGlilit, Israel
 2019 – Body Paint, Kibbutz Yad Mordechai, Israel 
 2019 – Breathing Space, Wilfrid Israel Museum of Asian Art, Israel
 2017 – “Same  Same but Different”, Haaretz collection, Minus1 Gallery, Tel Aviv, Israel 
 2016 – Winter Salon, Jenn Singer Gallery, New York NY
 2015 – Stains and Stampings, Sister Gallery, Tel Aviv, and Art Gallery, Nazareth, Israel
 2015 – Dinner for Breakfast, Victori and Mo Gallery, Brooklyn NY
 2014 – Dynasties, Haifa Museum, Israel
 2014 – From The Land of Everywhere, Birnam Wood Galleries, New York NY
 2014 – Chicago Triangle, Haifa museum, Israel.
 2014 – Broken Beads, Beer-Sheva University, Israel.
 2014 – Contemporary Israeli Art, Julie M, Toronto, Canada.
 2013 – Passive Aggressive, University Gallery, Tel Aviv, Israel
 2013 – A Picnic and Smokes, group show curated by Kipton Cronkite from @60, QF Gallery, East Hampton               
 2012 – The Merry Mummy, Ramat Gan Museum, Israel
 2012 – Three people show, Nye+Brown Gallery, LA
 2012 – Monkeys Nine People, Tel Aviv, Israel
 2012 – Masonite, Sommer Contemporary Art, Tel Aviv, Israel         
 2012 – Take my Breath Away, Julie M Gallery, Toronto, Canada
 2011 – Festival of Ideas-performance, The New Museum, New York
 2011 – A Group Exhibition, Julie M Gallery, Toronto, Canada             
 2010 – Balancing act, Hendershot gallery, New York
 2010 – Sweet Dreams, Bet Haomanim, Tel Aviv, Israel
 2008 – Lyons Weir Ortt Gallery, New York        
 2008 – Black & White, Slate Gallery, New York
 2008 – Timeless: The Art of Drawing, The Morris Museum, New Jersey              
 2008 – Eventually We'll Die: Young Art In Israel Of The 90's, Herzilya Museum of Contemporary Art, Israel
 2007 – Displacements, Ben-Ari Museum of Contemporary Art, Israel       
 2007 – Promised Land, Ermanno Tedeschi Gallery, Rome, Italy        
 2007 – Gallery Auction, Vered Gallery, East Hampton, New York
 2007 – Of The Painted Image, Jewish Museum of Pittsburgh, Pennsylvania
 2007 – The Big Show, Silas Marder Gallery, Bridgehampton, New York              
 2006 – Hybrid Space, Kulture Gardin, New York
 2005 – Head Over Hand: Pushing the Limits of Paint, Denise Bibro Fine Art, New York
 2005 – Little Red Riding Hood, Art Basel Miami, Dot Fifty One Art Space, Miami, Florida 
 2005 – On The Mark, University of Rhode Island, Kingston, Rhode Island         
 2005 – Viewfinder, Moti Hasson Gallery, New York             
 2005 – Dreaming Art Dreaming Reality, Tel Aviv Museum of Art, Israel
 2004 – Paintings that Paint Themselves, Kresge Art Museum, East Lansing, Michigan              
 2004 – Staccato, Jeffrey Coploff Fine Art, New York
 2004 – The sun still shines, Pack Gallery, Milan, Italy               
 2004 – I Want To Take You Higher, McKenzie Gallery, New York               
 2003 – Momus Gallery, Atlanta, Georgia
 2003 – Scope, Armory Show 2003, New York
 2003 – Liminal, Hamden Gallery, University of Massachusetts, Amherst, Massachusetts
 2002 – Artscape 2002, curated by John Yao, Meyerhoff Gallery, Maryland College of Art, Baltimore        
 2002 – New York in Texas, New Gallery, Houston, Texas
 2002 – Armory Show 2002, Stefan Stux Gallery Booth, New York
 2002 – Graham & Sons Gallery, New York
 2002 – Mother Tongue, Museum of Art, Ein Harod, Israel
 2000 – The Vera & Arturo Schwartz Collection of Contemporary Art, Tel Aviv Museum of Art, Israel
 2000 – Ladies and Gentlemen, Tel Aviv Museum of Art, Israel
 1999 – Liste 99, The Young Art Fair, Sommer Gallery, Basel, Switzerland
 1998 – Spring at the End of Summer Young Israeli Art, Tel Aviv Museum of Art, Israel         
 1998 – Women Artists, Haifa Museum of Art, Haifa, Israel
 1997 – The Museum Collection, Tel Aviv Museum of Art, Israel
 1996 – Refusalon Gallery, San Francisco, California
 1996 – The Vera & Arturo Schwartz Collection of Contemporary Art, Israel Museum, Jerusalem, Israel
 1996 – New in the Collection: Prints, Tel Aviv Museum of Art, Israel                       
 1995 – The Ministry of Science and the Arts Prize for a Young Artist, Artist's House Gallery, Tel Aviv, Israel        
 1995 – Blind Spot Test, Pyramid Center for Contemporary Art, Haifa, Israel
 1995 – The America-Israel Cultural Foundation Scholarship Recipients, Genia Schreiber University 
 1995 – Art Gallery, Tel Aviv University, Israel
 1994 – 90-70-90, Tel Aviv Museum of Art, Israel              
 1994 – Along New Lines: Israeli Drawing Today, Israel Museum, Jerusalem, Israel                 
 1994 – Meta-Sex, Mishkan-Le’Omeont Museum of Art & Bat-Yam Museum of Art, Israel
 1993 – Subtropical: Between Figural and Abstract, Tel Aviv Museum of Art, Israel

Collaborations
 2013 – "Mavirot project", Comme-il-faut, Tel-Aviv, Israel
 2012 – Artist Book, With poet Natan Zach. monotype prints. Gallery Harel, printers & publishers, Tel-Aviv, Israel.

Awards and scholarships
 2001 – International Studio & Curatorial Program, sponsored by the NY Cultural Corp. Commission
 1995 – Ministry of Science and the Arts Prize for Young Artists
 1995 – The Nathan Gottesdiener Foundation Israeli Art Prize
 1994 – Scholarship from the American-Israeli Cultural Foundation
 1990 – Scholarship from the American-Israeli Cultural Foundation

Public collections
Knesset of Israel, Jerusalem
Israel Museum, Jerusalem
Israel Tel Aviv Museum of Art
Israel Haifa Museum of Modern Art
Israel National Museum of Women in the Arts
San Marcos TexasFrederick R Weisman Art foundation
Los Angeles CAArtist Pension Trust Organization
Washington DC American University Museum 
Washington DCTexas State University

References

External links
 Artists's website
 Artis Contemporary

1966 births
Living people